Tamara Jovanović (born 22 May 1985) is a Serbian retired football midfielder who played for Mašinac Niš in the Serbian First League. She was Mašinac's top scorer in the European Cup with 12 goals, and she was a member of the Serbian national team. In 2012, she retired and joined Mašinac's coaching staff.

References

1985 births
Living people
Serbian women's footballers
Serbia women's international footballers
Women's association football midfielders
ŽFK Mašinac PZP Niš players